Cenaze Hasan Pasha (also known as Meyyit Hasan Pasha or Kethüda Hasan Pasha; died 1810) was a short-term  Ottoman grand vizier in 1789. His epithet Cenaze (or Meyyit) means "corpse" because he was ill when appointed to the post.

Early years
He was a Circassian servicing in various positions in the Ottoman Empire. He was the acting governor of Tripoliçe (now in Greece) in 1770 during the Russo-Turkish War (1768–1774). He defended the town against a Russia-backed rebellion. Upon this success he was promoted. While he was the governor of Vidin (now northwest Bulgaria) he took part in the Battle of Karánsebes in the scope of the Russo-Turkish War (1787–1792) and contributed to the victory.

As a grand vizier
On 28 May 1789, he was appointed as the grand vizier (highest rank of the empire other than that of the sultan). But he was sick in bed when he received  the sultan's letter of appointment, and so he was nicknamed Cenaze (corpse). On 22 September he personally led the army against the Austrian-Russian alliance in the Battle of Rymnik (called Boze by the Turks),  but he was defeated. After this defeat he was dismissed on 2 December 1789.

Later years
He was appointed as the governor of Rusçuk (now Ruse in Bulgaria). But later he was exiled to Bozcaada (a Turkish island). In 1792, he was pardoned and appointed as the governor of Silistra (now in Bulgaria). Later he was transferred to various cities such as Chania, Heraklion (both in Crete island), Bender (now in Moldova) and Khotyn (now in Ukraine). While he was in Khotyn, he fell prisoner to the Russians in the newly begun Russo-Turkish War (1806–1812). After the peace treaty, he retired and died in Larissa in 1810.

See also 
 List of Ottoman Grand Viziers

References

1810 deaths
Year of birth unknown
Pashas
People from the Ottoman Empire of Circassian descent
18th-century Grand Viziers of the Ottoman Empire